Marina de la Caridad Rodríguez Mitjan (born 2 March 1995) is a Cuban weightlifter. She competed in the women's 63 kg event at the 2016 Summer Olympics. She competed at the 2020 Summer Olympics.

References

External links
 

1995 births
Living people
Cuban female weightlifters
Olympic weightlifters of Cuba
Weightlifters at the 2016 Summer Olympics
Pan American Games medalists in weightlifting
Pan American Games silver medalists for Cuba
Weightlifters at the 2015 Pan American Games
Weightlifters at the 2019 Pan American Games
Medalists at the 2015 Pan American Games
Weightlifters at the 2020 Summer Olympics
21st-century Cuban women